Meagan Monique Good (born August 8, 1981) is an American actress. She first gained critical attention for her role in the film Eve's Bayou (1997), prior to landing the role of Nina in the Nickelodeon sitcom Cousin Skeeter (1998–2001). Good received further prominence after starring in the films Deliver Us from Eva (2003), Roll Bounce (2005), and Stomp the Yard (2007).

In 2012, Good featured in an ensemble cast of the film Think Like a Man. The following year, she played Joanna Locasto, the lead character on the NBC drama series Deception; and starred in the comedy Anchorman 2: The Legend Continues. Furthermore, Good has had supporting roles in the films One Missed Call (2008), Saw V (2008), The Unborn (2009) and DC Comics' Shazam! (2019).

Early life and family 
Good was born August 8, 1981 in the Panorama City neighborhood of Los Angeles. Her mother, Tyra Wardlow-Doyle, worked as Good's manager into her teens, and her father, Leondis "Leon" Good, is an LAPD police officer. Good has claimed that her maternal grandmother is "Jewish and African. My mother's father was Cherokee and something else. My dad's mother's Puerto Rican and black, and his father was from Barbados." Good was raised in Canyon Country (now known as Santa Clarita), California. She has three siblings, including older sister and fellow actress La'Myia Good. She began her acting career around the age of four.

According to Good, she grew up "super nerdy, super skinny, buckteeth, big ole afro and yet I had a sense of confidence about myself, like, 'they just don't get it yet'. She was a fan of Justin Timberlake and Usher in her teens. Good did not have any role models until early adulthood, when she began admiring actress Charlize Theron.

Career

Childhood
In the early stages of her career, Good worked as an extra on television shows such as Doogie Howser, M.D. and Amen. When she was 13, she was cast in her first film, the 1995 comedy Friday. She first gained critical recognition for her performance as the troubled teen Cisely Batiste in Kasi Lemmons' 1997 film Eve's Bayou; she received two award nominations, including her first NAACP Image Award nomination.

Adulthood
After taking on small film and television roles for the next few years, Good began to transition into more mature roles in the early 2000s. Good believes she was able to move into adult roles due to playing characters several years younger than her. From 1998 to 2001, she appeared as Nina on Nickelodeon's TV show Cousin Skeeter. Good landed small roles in the films 3 Strikes and House Party 4: Down to the Last Minute.

In 2003, a major year for Good, she landed roles in the action-drama Biker Boyz and the romantic-comedy Deliver Us from Eva, which helped her transition from child to adult actress. She also appeared as the character Vanessa for one season of My Wife and Kids, before being replaced by another actor. In 2004, Good starred alongside Jordana Brewster, Sara Foster, and Jill Ritchie in the action film D.E.B.S., and received a Best Actress nomination at the 2005 Black Movie Awards. She also had small roles in The Cookout, Lance "Un" Rivera's directorial debut, and the teen dance film You Got Served.

In 2005, Good co-starred in the horror film Venom, as well as the well-received neo noir film Brick. She played opposite rapper/actor Bow Wow in Malcolm D. Lee's Roll Bounce. In 2006, Good played the role of Coco, which she felt was her first true lead actress role, in the urban action-drama Waist Deep. Good also voiced a character for the video game Scarface: The World Is Yours that same year. The following year, Good landed a role in the dance movie Stomp the Yard, starring with Ne-Yo and childhood and personal 
friend Columbus Short. In 2008, Good appeared in the horror film One Missed Call as an ill-fated college student, Shelley Baum. She appeared as an angry trophy wife in the Mike Myers comedy The Love Guru, and in the latter half of the year, she was one of the victims/gameplayers in Saw V. She starred in 2009's The Unborn with Gary Oldman and Odette Yustman.

She was part of the ensemble cast in 2012's Think Like a Man, a movie based on Steve Harvey's 2009 book Act like a Lady, Think like a Man. In 2013, Good starred in Anchorman 2: The Legend Continues. Good returned to television from January to March 2013, starring in Deception. Good was contacted by her agents about the series while leaving a hair salon. She sat in her car "and cried for 30-minutes like a nerd, by myself." In 2014, Good reprised her role for Think Like a Man Too, the sequel to Think Like a Man. Good stated she "had a really good time" while filming the sequel after initially being nervous "because there's so much energy that only Vegas can give." Filming Think Like a Man Too was Good's first time in Las Vegas shortly before she got married.

Good has also appeared in many music videos, by artists such as 50 Cent, (21 Questions), Imajin, Isyss (of which Good's sister La'Myia Good is a member), Lil' Johnny, Memphis Bleek, Tyrese, and Will Smith.

She has started her own production company, Freedom Bridge Entertainment, with Marlon Olivera and fellow actors Tamara Bass and Ty Hodges.

Good wore a royal blue dress designed by Michael Costello to the June 30, 2013 BET Awards ceremony. The dress featured a plunging neckline down to her midriff and a front slit that rose to midthigh, It was sometimes compared to the Green Versace dress worn by Jennifer Lopez to the 42nd Annual Grammy Awards in 2000. Fashion & Style editors selected Good as "worst dressed" at the ceremony.

The dress was controversial also because Good was presenting the BET Award for Best Gospel Artist. According to Christine Thomasos of The Christian Post, Good has a history of defending her stylistic choices of presenting herself as a "sexy Christian". She had said earlier that year:

there is a classy way to do everything and there is nothing wrong with being sexy or having sex appeal and I think that I am definitely going to be someone who is boldly going to go out to the masses and be someone who say, 'Look! Women its okay' ...

Good responded on Instagram, expressing sadness that judgment had been passed on her, her character and her then-husband over what she wore to the ceremony. She said she picked the dress because she liked it and tried to express her individuality in her dress.

Personal life 
Although she was not raised in the church, Good is a Christian, considers herself a spiritual person and has said in numerous interviews that she declines roles that she feels might "disappoint God." She explained in an interview that Jesus tops her list of heroes, and the last book she read was the Bible.

At age 22, Good chose to focus on her career rather than dating, as she explained in a 2004 interview. In 2011, Good began dating DeVon Franklin, an executive for Columbia Pictures and Seventh-day Adventist preacher. They became engaged in early April 2012, and were  married on June 16, 2012, at Triunfo Creek Winery in Malibu, California. The pair stated that they remained chaste in their relationship prior to their marriage. In December 2021, it was announced Good and Franklin were divorcing after 9 years of marriage. Their divorce was finalized in June 2022.

Filmography

Film

Television

Video games

Music videos

Accolades

See also 
 List of Puerto Ricans

References

External links 

 

20th-century American actresses
21st-century American actresses
1981 births
Actresses from Los Angeles
African-American actresses
African-American Christians
American child actresses
American Christians
American film actresses
American television actresses
Living people
People from Canyon Country, Santa Clarita, California
People from Panorama City, Los Angeles
Converts to Christianity
20th-century African-American women
20th-century African-American people
21st-century African-American women
American people of African descent
American people of Jewish descent
American people of Puerto Rican descent
American people of Barbadian descent